Pitlam is a Town and Mandal in the Kamareddy revenue division of the kamareddy district in the Indian state of Telangana.

Geography
It has an average elevation of 423 meters (1391 feet).
Nizam Sagar Dam  only 7 km away from Pitlam.

References 

Villages in Nizamabad district